Chelleh-ye Olya (also Romanized as Chelleh-ye ‘Olyā and Cheleh-ye ‘Olyā; also known as Chelleh’ī-ye Bālā, Chelleh-ye Bālā, and Cheleh-ye Bālā) is a village in Sar Firuzabad Rural District, Firuzabad District, Kermanshah County, Kermanshah Province, Iran. At the 2006 census, its population was 200, in 44 families.

References 

Populated places in Kermanshah County